India(n) Open may refer to:

 Indian Open (tennis)
 WTA Indian Open (women's tennis)
 Indian Open (golf)
 Indian Open (snooker)
 India Open (badminton)
 India Open (table tennis)
 1996 India Open, inaugural edition of the Chennai Open

See also
Indian Defence,  a group of Chess openings, also known as Indian openings